"Saturday Night (Is the Loneliest Night in the Week)", also known as "Saturday Night (Is the Loneliest Night of the Week)", is a popular song published in 1944 with music by Jule Styne and lyrics by Sammy Cahn.

Background
Although it has been interpreted as referring to the separation of romantic partners during wartime, Cahn said that song actually refers to show business people who are not working on Saturday night.

1945 recordings
Charted versions in 1945 were by Frank Sinatra (recorded November 14, 1944, released by Columbia Records as catalog number 36762), (No. 2 in the charts), Sammy Kaye and His Orchestra (vocal by Nancy Norman) (No. 6), Frankie Carle and His Orchestra (vocal by Phyllis Lynne) (No. 8), Woody Herman and His Orchestra (vocal by Frances Wayne) (No. 15) and by The King Sisters (No. 15).

Other versions
Frank Sinatra - recorded November 29, 1957 for Capitol Records
Julie London - for her album For the Night People (1966)
Rosemary Clooney - for her album For the Duration (1991)
Barry Manilow - Manilow Sings Sinatra (1998)

Popular culture
Sinatra also sang the song in the short The All-Star Bond Rally (1945).

References

1944 songs
Frank Sinatra songs
Songs with lyrics by Sammy Cahn
Songs with music by Jule Styne
Swing music
Torch songs